To Touch the Soul is a 2007 documentary film directed by Ryan Goble and produced by Teresa Hagen.  The film was written by Goble and Erin Henning, from a story by Hagen.  The documentary is narrated by Cassandra Hepburn.

Synopsis
To Touch the Soul follows California State University, Long Beach Professor Carlos Silveira, a Brazilian-born artist educator and social activist, who recruits 27 American university students to join him in a pilot program that uses art to help impoverished Cambodian children affected by HIV/AIDS express their wishes and desires for their futures.  As Carlos and the students grapple with the realities of a culture much different from their own, a language they don't understand, art projects that don't go as planned and a three-week deadline, they form a bond with the children.  Through these young Cambodian mentors—all of them abandoned by society—the Americans empower their own social activism and learn the true meaning of kindness, selflessness, courage and community.

Interviews
 Carlos Silveira
 Saneya Bair
 Heather Hamilton
 John Lachey
 Amanda Mithers
 Saveun Nhim
 Casey Quirarte
 John Tucker
 Sundy Ven
 Cassandra Hepburn (Narrator)

Background
The story is told from Carlos’ and six of his students’ perspectives through a mix of spoken (voice-over) diary entries, interviews and interaction with the children as they create art projects together, and shows that even the smallest attempt at making a difference can have life-changing consequences for all the people involved.  The film also highlights the growing problem of the 77,000 children in Cambodia who have become orphans due to their parents dying from AIDS, a population expected to grow to 108,700 over the next five years.

Filming locations
Filming locations include: Long Beach, California and Phnom Penh, Cambodia.

Film festivals
La Femme Film Festival, Beverly Hills, California
 Wild Rose Independent Film Festival, Ames, Iowa
 Myrtle Beach International Film Festival, Myrtle Beach, South Carolina
 Conscious Life Film Festival, Los Angeles, California
 Byron Bay Film Festival,  Byron Bay, New South Wales, Australia
 Memphis International Film Festival, Memphis, Tennessee
 Newport Beach Film Festival, Newport Beach, California
 Global Arts Film Festival, Los Angeles, California
 San Joaquin Film Festival, Stockton, California
 Action on Film International Film Festival, Pasadena, California
 Southern Winds Film Festival, Shawnee, Oklahoma

Awards
Wins
 Accolade Competition: Best of Show, Videography, 2007; Honorable Mention, Motivational/Inspirational Category, 2007.
 Wild Rose Independent Film Festival: Best Documentary Film, 2007; Certificate of Distinctive Achievement - Director of a Feature Film (Ryan Goble), 2007; Debut Film Certificate of Distinctive Achievement, 2007.
 Myrtle Beach International Film Festival: Honorable Mention, 2007.
 Byron Bay (Australia) Film Festival: Honorable Mention, 2008.
 San Joaquin Film Festival: Best Documentary, 2008.
 Southern Winds Film Festival: Best Feature Documentary, 2009.

References

External links
 
 To Touch the Soul Free streaming of full movie
 

2007 films
2007 documentary films
American documentary films
Documentary films about HIV/AIDS
American independent films
2007 independent films
2000s English-language films
HIV/AIDS in American films
2000s American films